Polemograptis is a genus of moths belonging to the subfamily Tortricinae of the family Tortricidae.

Species
Polemograptis miltocosma Meyrick, 1910
Polemograptis rubristria Razowski, 1966

Former species
Polemograptis chrysodesma Diakonoff, 1952

See also
List of Tortricidae genera

References

 , 2005: World Catalogue of Insects vol. 5 Tortricidae.

External links
tortricidae.com

Tortricini
Tortricidae genera